Yago Mateus dos Santos (born March 9, 1999), is a Brazilian basketball player revealed by Palmeiras and that has defended Paulistano from 2016 to 2020 and currently plays for ratiopharm Ulm of the German Basketball Bundesliga.

ESPN and ESporte called him one of the greatest revelations of Brazilian basketball of the 2010s.

Professional career 
On July 20, 2022, Yago signed a two-year contract with German club ratiopharm Ulm of the German Basketball Bundesliga.

References

External links
 Profile at realgm.com

1999 births
Living people
2019 FIBA Basketball World Cup players
Brazilian men's basketball players
Ratiopharm Ulm players
Sociedade Esportiva Palmeiras basketball players
People from Tupã, São Paulo